The Trouble with Being Born is a 2020 science fiction drama film directed and co-written by Sandra Wollner. An international co-production of Austria and Germany, the film depicts an android (Lena Watson) living with a man (Dominik Warta) as a replicant in place of his young daughter who had disappeared years prior.

On its premier at the 70th Berlin International Film Festival, the film garnered controversy for its depiction of a relationship between a man and a 10 year old child, albeit an android, that also resembles his daughter.

Plot
The film explores the topos of the artificial human, presented here in an unusual way with a focus on the emotional level. Elli is an android, a machine, in the shape of a girl, as well as a sex robot. Elli lives with Georg, whom she calls "Papa". They drift through a summer, swimming in the pool during the day and in the evening he takes her to bed with him. Georg created Elli from a personal memory, to make himself happy. A memory that means nothing to her and everything to him. For Elli, it is merely the programming she follows. When she later meets her real-life role model, an odyssey develops that increasingly brings the audience to Elli's perspective. The dystopian film portrays "the story of a machine and the ghosts we all carry within us".

Cast
 Lena Watson as Elli/Emil, an android
 Dominik Warta as Georg
 Ingrid Burkhard as Ms. Schikowa
 Jana McKinnon as Elli, Georg's human daughter
 Simon Hatzl as Toni

Production
Director and co-writer Sandra Wollner has referred to the film as the "antithesis to Pinocchio". Wollner initially intended to cast a 20-year-old actress in the role of the android Elli, but after editing some of the more explicit elements from the film's script, instead chose 10-year-old actress Lena Watson (a stage name, inspired by Emma Watson) for the role. The scenes in which the android is shown nude were accomplished using computer-generated imagery. Watson also wore a silicone mask and wig, which served to both conceal her identity and enable her to resemble another actress who appears later in the film.

Release and reception
The Trouble with Being Born had its world premiere at the 70th Berlin International Film Festival on 25 February 2020, as part of the festival's Encounters section. It was reported that several audience members walked out during the premiere. The film received the Special Jury Award in the Encounters section.

Jonathan Romney of Screen Daily called the film "a powerful and revelatory achievement [...] complex, artfully crafted, sometimes wilfully perplexing". Jessica Kiang of Variety called it a "desperately creepy, queasy, thought-provoking film", and concluded: "Wollner's lacerating intelligence and riveting craft make this extraordinarily effed-up riff on the 'Pinocchio' legend [...] much more than empty provocation". Chris Barsanti of Slant Magazine gave the film a rating of two out of four stars, and wrote that the film "suffers from the same issue as its moody androids: enervation borne out of repetition."

The Melbourne International Film Festival decided to not screen the film at its 2020 festival, citing concerns raised by two forensic psychologists that it might "[normalise] sexual interest in children" and be "used as a source of arousal for men interested in child abuse material". The decision to remove the film from the festival line-up was denounced by film critics Peter Krausz, Tom Ryan and David Stratton.

References

External links
 
 

2020 films
2020 drama films
2020 science fiction films
2020s dystopian films
Android (robot) films
Austrian drama films
Austrian science fiction films
Films about pedophilia
2020s German-language films
German drama films
German science fiction films
Sex robots
Film controversies in Austria
Film controversies in Germany
Obscenity controversies in film